Bodianus opercularis, the blackspot hogfish, is a species of wrasse. 
It is found in the Indian Ocean, the Red Sea, the Gulf of Aqaba in the north to Madagascar and Mauritius in the south, and then east to Christmas Island.

Size

References

opercularis
Fish of the Pacific Ocean

Taxa named by Alphonse Guichenot
Fish described in 1847